James Roberts (born 14 February 1837) was a seaman of the United States Navy who was awarded the Medal of Honor for gallantry during the American Civil War. He was born in England in 1837 and lived in Hartford, Connecticut. The explosion of the fire ship caused significant fires in Fort Fisher for at least one day. Roberts was awarded the Medal of Honor for this action on 31 December 1864.

Roberts' Medal of Honor citation reads:

References 

Union Navy sailors
United States Navy Medal of Honor recipients
American Civil War recipients of the Medal of Honor
1837 births
Year of death missing